The history of English grammars begins late in the sixteenth century with the Pamphlet for Grammar by William Bullokar. In the early works, the structure and rules of English grammar were based on those of Latin. A more modern approach, incorporating phonology, was introduced in the nineteenth century.

Sixteenth to eighteenth centuries
The first English grammar, Pamphlet for Grammar by William Bullokar, written with the seeming goal of demonstrating that English was quite as rule-bound as Latin, was published in 1586. Bullokar's grammar was faithfully modeled on William Lily's Latin grammar, Rudimenta Grammatices (1534). Lily's grammar was being used in schools in England at the time, having been "prescribed" for them in 1542 by Henry VIII.  Although Bullokar wrote his grammar in English and used a "reformed spelling system" of his own invention, many English grammars, for much of the century after Bullokar's effort, were to be written in Latin; this was especially the case for books whose authors were aiming to be scholarly. Christopher Cooper's Grammatica Linguæ Anglicanæ (1685) was the last English grammar written in Latin.

Latin grammar traditions bore down oppressively on early English grammar writing.  Any attempt by one author to assert an independent grammatical rule for English was quickly followed by declarations by others of the truth of the corresponding Latin-based equivalent.  As late as the early nineteenth century, Lindley Murray, the author of a widely used grammar, was having to cite "grammatical authorities" to bolster the claim that grammatical cases in English are different from the ones in Ancient Greek or Latin.  

The focus on tradition belied the role that other social forces had begun to play in the early seventeenth century.  Increasing commerce, and the social changes in its wake, created a new impetus for grammar writing.  The greater British role in international trade in the second half of the century, created a demand for English grammars among speakers of other languages.  Quite a few English grammars were published in European languages.  Grammars were also being written for "non-learned, native-speaker audiences" in Britain, such as women, merchants, tradesmen, and children.  As education and literacy had become more widespread by the early eighteenth century, many grammars, such as John Brightland's A Grammar of the English tongue (1759) and James Greenwood's Essay towards a practical English grammar, were intended for those without a Latin background, including the "fair sex" and children.

If by the end of the seventeenth century, English grammar writing had made a modest start, totaling 16 grammars from the time of Bullokar's Pamphlet, by the end of the eighteenth century, a brisk pace had been set with some 270 titles added, a large proportion published late in the century. Both publishing and demand were to continue to mushroom.  The first half of the nineteenth century would see the appearance of almost 900 new English grammar books.  Showing little originality, most took the tack of claiming—as justification for their appearance—that the needs of their particular target audience were still unmet or that a particular "grammatical point" had not been adequately treated in the preexisting texts, or oftentimes both.  Texts that aimed to be utilitarian and egalitarian were proliferating.  Edward Shelley's The people's grammar; or English grammar without difficulties for 'the million''' (1848), for example, was written for "the mechanic and hard-working youth, in their solitary struggles for the acquirement of knowledge."  William Cobbett's popular mid-century book was titled, A Grammar of the English Language, In a Series of Letters: Intended for the Use of Schools and of Young Persons in General, but more especially for the use of Soldiers, Sailors, Apprentices, and Plough-Boys. Ann Fisher published her influential English grammar in 1745 and some 30 editions thereafter, making it one of the most popular early English grammars and the first written by a woman.

Eighteenth-century prescriptive grammars
Robert Lowth, Bishop of Oxford and thereafter of London, scholar of Hebrew poetry, and for a short time Oxford Professor of Poetry, was one of the best known of the widely emulated grammarians of the 18th century.  A self-effacing clergyman, he published A Short Introduction to English Grammar, with critical notes (1762), his only work on the subject, without the author's name on the title page.  His influence extended, through the works of his students Lindley Murray and William Cobbett, well into the late 19th century.  He would also become, among prescriptive grammarians, the target of choice for criticism by later descriptivist linguists.

In America in 1765, the Rev. Dr. Samuel Johnson, founder and first president of King's College in New York City (now Columbia University) published An English Grammar; the First Easy Rudiments of Grammar Applied to the English Tongue. It "appears to have been the first English grammar prepared by an American and published in America." In 1767, Johnson combined his grammar with a Hebrew grammar, and published it as An English and Hebrew grammar, being the first short rudiments of those two languages, suggesting the languages be taught together to children. Johnson developed his grammars independently of Lowth, but later corresponded and exchanged grammars with him. English grammar increasingly held great significance for people in the United States with little to no income, and educational backgrounds. Learning the basic principles of grammar helped a cross-section ranging from former slaves to rail splitters and weavers to speak and write with fluency and rise in their careers.

In Britain, the women Ellin Devis, Dorothea Du Bois, Mrs. M. C. Edwards, Mrs. Eves, Ellenor Fenn (aka Mrs. Teachwell and Mrs. Lovechild), Ann Fisher, Jane Gardiner née Arden, Blanche Mercy, and Mrs. Taylor, published some twelve grammars in the late 18th-century, their books running into many editions over several decades.  English grammar was being seen to be important not only for better English writing but also for learning other languages thereafter.

Nineteenth century to present
Modern-language studies became systematized during the nineteenth century.  In the case of English, this happened first in continental Europe, where it was studied by historical and comparative linguists.  In 1832, Danish philologist Rasmus Rask published an English grammar, Engelsk Formlære, part of his extensive comparative studies in the grammars of Indo-European languages.  German philologist Jacob Grimm, the elder of the Brothers Grimm, included English grammar in his monumental grammar of Germanic languages, Deutsche Grammatik (1822–1837).  German historical linguist Eduard Adolf Maetzner published his 1,700 page Englische Grammatik between 1860 and 1865; an English translation, An English grammar: methodical, analytical and historical appeared in 1874.  Contributing little new to the intrinsic scientific study of English grammar, these works nonetheless showed that English was being studied seriously by the first professional linguists.

As phonology became a full-fledged field, spoken English began to be studied scientifically as well, generating by the end of the nineteenth century an international enterprise investigating the structure of the language.  This enterprise comprised scholars at various universities, their students who were training to be teachers of English, and journals publishing new research.  All the pieces were in place for new "large-scale English grammars" which combined the disparate approaches of the previous decades.  The first work to lay claim to the new scholarship was British linguist Henry Sweet's A new English grammar: logical and historical, published in two parts, Phonology and Accidence (1892) and Syntax (1896), its title suggesting not only continuity and contrast with Maetzner's earlier work, but also kinship with the contemporary A New English Dictionary on Historical Principles (begun 1884), later the Oxford English Dictionary (1895).  Two other contemporary English grammars were also influential.  English Grammar: Past and Present, by John Collinson Nesfield, was originally written for the market in colonial India.  It was later expanded to appeal to students in Britain as well, from young men preparing for various professional examinations to students in "Ladies' Colleges." Other books by Nesfield include A Junior Course In English Composition, A Senior Course In English Composition, but it was his A Manual Of English Grammar and Composition that proved really successful both in Britain and her colonies—so much so that it formed the basis for many other grammar and composition primers including but not limited to Warriner's English Grammar and Composition, and High School English Grammar and Composition, casually called Wren & Martin, by P. C. Wren and H. Martin. Grammar of spoken English (1924), by H. E. Palmer, written for the teaching and study of English as a foreign language, included a full description of the intonation patterns of English.

The next set of wide-ranging English grammars were written by Danish and Dutch linguists.   Danish linguist Otto Jespersen, who had coauthored a few books with Henry Sweet, began work on his seven-volume Modern English grammar on historical principles in the first decade of the twentieth century.  The first volume, Sounds and Spellings, was published in 1909; it then took forty years for the remaining volumes on syntax (volumes 2 through 5), morphology (volume 6), and syntax again (volume 7), to be completed.  Jespersen's original contribution was in analyzing the various parts of a sentence in terms of categories that he named, rank, junction, and nexus, forgoing the usual word classes.  His ideas  would inspire the later work of Noam Chomsky and Randolph Quirk.

The Dutch tradition of writing English grammars, which began with Thomas Basson's The Conjugations in Englische and Netherdutche in the same year—1586—as William Bullokar's first English grammar (written in English), gained renewed strength in the early 20th century in the work of three grammarians: Hendrik Poutsma, Etsko Kruisinga, and Reinard Zandvoort.  Poutsma's Grammar of late modern English, published between 1904 and 1929 and written for "continental, especially Dutch students," selected all its examples from English literature.

Timeline of English grammars
1551. John Hart The Opening of the Unreasonable Writing of our Inglish Toung1586. William Bullokar:  Brief Grammar of English.
1594. Paul Greaves: Grammatica Anglicana.
1612. Thomas Tomkis De Analogia Anglicani Sermoni liber Grammaticus, Royal Manuscript Collection of the British Library (12.F.xviii).
1617. Alexander Hume:  Orthographie and Congruitie of the Britan Tongue.
1619/1621. Alexander Gill: Logonomia Anglica.
1634. Charles Butler: English Grammar.
1640. Ben Jonson: The English Grammar.
1646. Joshua Poole: The English Accidence.
1653. John Wallis: Grammatica Linguæ Anglicanæ.
1654. Jeremiah Wharton: The English Grammar.
1662. James Howell:  A New English Grammar.
1669. John Newton: School Pastime for Young Children: or the Rudiments of Grammar.
1671. Thomas Lye: The Child's Delight.
1685. Christopher Cooper: Grammatica Linguæ Anglicanæ.
1688. Guy Miège: The English Grammar.
1693. Joseph Aickin: The English grammar.
1700. A. Lane: A Key to the Art of Letters.
1745. Ann Fisher A New Grammar.
1761. Joseph Priestley: The Rudiments of English Grammar:Adapted to the Use of Schools.
1762. Robert Lowth: A short introduction to English grammar: with critical notes.
1763. John Ash: Grammatical institutes: or, An easy introduction to Dr. Lowth's English grammar.
1765. William Ward: An Essay on English Grammar.
1766. Samuel Johnson: A dictionary of the English Language...: to which is prefixed, a Grammar of the English Language.
1772. Joseph Priestley: The Rudiments of English Grammar: Adapted to the Use of Schools.
1775.  Ellin Devis: The Accidence1772. Dorothea Du Bois: Short English Grammar1795. Lindley Murray: English grammar: adapted to the different classes of learners.
1799. Jane Gardiner: Young Ladies’ Grammar 
1804. Noah Webster: A Grammatical Institute of the English Language.
1809. William Hazlitt: A New and Improved Grammar of the English Tongue1818. William Cobbett: A Grammar of the English Language, In a Series of Letters.
1850. William Chauncey Fowler: English grammar: The English language in its elements and forms.
1874. Eduard Adolf Maetzner, An English grammar: methodical, analytical, and historical. With a treatise on the orthography, prosody, inflections and syntax of the English tongue, and numerous authorities cited in order of historical development. (English translation of Englische Grammatik (1860–65)).
1892/98. Henry Sweet: A New English Grammar, Logical and Historical (Part 1: Introduction, Phonology, and Accidence; Part 2: Syntax).
1898. John Nesfield. A Manual of English Grammar and Composition.
1904–1929. Hendrik Poutsma: A Grammar of Modern English (5 volumes).
1909–1932. Etsko Kruisinga: A Handbook of Present-day English1909–1949. Otto Jespersen: A Modern English Grammar on Historical Principles.
1931/1935. George O. Curme: A Grammar of the English Language.
1945. R. W. Zandvoort: A Handbook of English Grammar.
1952. Charles C. Fries: The Structure of English: An Introduction to the Construction of English Sentences.
1984. M. A. K. Halliday: An Introduction to Functional Grammar.
1985. Randolph Quirk, Sidney Greenbaum, Geoffrey Leech, and Jan Svartvik: A Comprehensive Grammar of the English Language.
1996 Sidney Greenbaum, Oxford English Grammar. 652 pages.
1999. Douglas Biber, Stig Johansson, Geoffrey Leech, Susan Conrad, and Edward Finegan: Longman Grammar of Spoken and Written English.
2002. Rodney Huddleston and Geoffrey Pullum: The Cambridge Grammar of the English Language. 1842 pages.
2006. Ronald Carter and Michael McCarthy: Cambridge Grammar of English: A Comprehensive Guide. 973 pages.
2011. Bas Aarts: Oxford Modern English Grammar''. 410 pages.

See also
English grammar

Footnotes

Notes

References